Sandur, also spelt Sundur, was a village located in Iraqi Kurdistan, about 70 miles north of Mosul, near Duhok, towards Amediyah. First an historically Christian village, it later became an agricultural settlement inhabited by Kurdish Jews.

History
In ancient times the place had been inhabited by Christians. and was later inhabited by Kurds and Jews after the Christians deserted it.

In 1849, Sandur was described as an extensive village, containing over 100 Jewish households with a few inhabited by Kurds. By the first half of the 20th century, the village was entirely Jewish. All the village lands belonged to Jews who worked in the vineyards and orchards of pears, plums, pomegranates and apples.

In 1933 there were about 60 Jewish families. In 1934, Benzion Israeli found 800 inhabitants and wrote that "Sandur is a state of its own ... this is a Jewish village, an autonomous Jewish republic." In 1935, Walter Schwarz visited the village and gave a detailed report. He noted that it was inhabited only by Jews and that the fields and vineyards were well kept and yielded good crops.
Mordechai Zaken, who investigated the history of Kurdistani Jews in the previous centuries, explained why in some reports there seemed to be only Jews residing in the village, while in other reports, the Muslim Kurds lived in the outskirts of the village. Apparently, the work of the Muslim Kurds in Sabbath disturbed the Jews, so they asked a judge from Mosul to ask the Kurds to move to the outskirts of the village. The Kurds agreed, but the Jews had to buy their houses, and so they did.
After Iraq gained independence in 1932, the position of the Jews started to deteriorate. In July 1941 it was reported in the Jewish Digest that the leader of the village expressed his wish that the 50 families living there could "sell their village and immigrate to Palestine". During the Allied occupation of Iraq and in the backdrop of the Farhud, sporadic attacks on Jews continued throughout World War II. On December 17, 1942, anti-Jewish riots resulted in the murder of eight Jews in the village. In 1943, Friedrich Simon Bodenheimer visited Sandur for an evening. He found the atmosphere disturbed by the "unfriendly attitude of the neighbouring Kurdish villages." He claimed the Jews could not even sell their land, as the Kurds said "We will soon get it for nothing!" With the creation of the State of Israel in 1948, things got worse for Iraq's Jews who were portrayed as Zionists. Their freedom of movement was restricted and many lost their jobs. In 1949 there were still about 100 families living in Sandur.

On March 9, 1950, a law was passed which apparently depicted Jews as unprotected aliens. Soon after, rural Jews faced a worsening economic situation and felt increasingly vulnerable. In early June, it was reported that the neighbouring villages were threatening to murder the people of Sandur unless they left the village. The villagers were among the first wave of Jews who left the countryside for Baghdad to sign up for emigration. Within the next few years, the remaining 500 Jews of Sandur emigrated to Israel. in Israel, the former inhabitants of Sandur founded the moshav of Sde Trumot.

See also
Iraqi Jews in Israel

References

Populated places in Dohuk Province
Historic Jewish communities in Iraq
Jewish villages in the Ottoman Empire
Assyrian communities in Iraq